The Tata Management Training Centre (TMTC) was established by JRD Tata in the year 1966. Located in Pune, was awarded with the Golden Peacock National Training Award  (2007–08) in the field of Training & Development. TMTC focuses on Management and Development.

It has disseminated over 50 publications including management briefs, manuals, research papers, case studies.

Shubro Sen, Former Director, described TMTC by "It is not purely an academic institution. But it functions at the intersection of learning and practice".

History
TMTC is housed in a structure designed by architect George Wittet, on rambling grounds surrounded by leafy trees, lawns, pathways and flower beds. The 15 acres of land on which TMTC stands once belonged to leading solicitor F. E. Dinshaw. In 1918, Dinshaw acquired the services of Wittet, the then consulting architect to the Government of Bombay, to build him a country home. Additional suites were designed by Daraius Batliwala and Rustom Patell of Patell Batliwala & Associates.

In the 1960s, it was restored and turned it into a residential training center though the original layout remains the same.
The institute can house 60 people at its residential facilities, with two lecture halls and two seminar rooms. It also has a library of management books, journals and films. Along with its facilities for training and living, TMTC has facilities for indoor and outdoor sports.

Its facilities have been utilized by other specialized training institutes, including the Indian Institutes of Management (Ahmedabad and Calcutta), the Administrative Staff College of India (Hyderabad), the All India Management Association and the Indian Society for Applied Behavioral Sciences.

Training
Offering around 250 programs a year, conducted by in-house senior faculty from academics and business, supported by experts from the best of Indian and international B schools. 
TMTC started its e-learning programs in 2009. Every year, more than 4,000 Tata Managers and Leaders go through the training programs.

Leadership development programs include
 Tata Group Strategic Leadership seminar
 Tata Group Executive Leadership seminar
 Tata Group emerging Leaders seminar

E-learning programs include
 Live e-classroom
 Live video broadcast and
 Self-paced e-learning programs

A self-paced program is conducted named 'TATA – Harvard Manage Mentor self-paced e-learning program'  by Harvard Manage Mentor, in association with Harvard Business School Publishing, providing 44 different programs for Tata employees.

Objectives
TMTC objectives include:
Improvement of organizational performance through dissemination of the latest knowledge and skills among practicing managers
Facilitation of attitudinal and behavioral changes
Facilitation of solutions for organizational issues
Development of learning organizations
Training methodology

Practice areas
Its practice areas include
Finance, Ethics
Leadership and Organization
Markets and Customers
Strategy and Innovation

It also uses over 120 external faculty.

TMTC hosted training programs for the Indian Administrative Service (IAS), the Indian Police Service (IPS) and the Indian Foreign Service (IFS).

Partners
TMTC partners with a number of organizations, which include Centre for Creative Leadership (CCL), the Conference Executive Board (CEB), the American Society for Training and Development (ASTD) and the Goldratt Schools.

References

Tata institutions
Tata Group
Leadership training
Management education
Educational institutions established in 1966
Education in Pune
1966 establishments in Maharashtra